The 1965 VFL season was the 69th season of the Victorian Football League (VFL), the highest level senior Australian rules football competition in Victoria. The season featured twelve clubs, ran from 17 April until 25 September, and comprised an 18-game home-and-away season followed by a finals series featuring the top four clubs.

The premiership was won by the Essendon Football Club for the twelfth time, after it defeated  by 35 points in the 1965 VFL Grand Final.

Premiership season
In 1965, the VFL competition consisted of twelve teams of 18 on-the-field players each, plus two substitute players, known as the 19th man and the 20th man. A player could be substituted for any reason; however, once substituted, a player could not return to the field of play under any circumstances.

Teams played each other in a home-and-away season of 18 rounds; matches 12 to 18 were the "home-and-way reverse" of matches 1 to 7.

Once the 18 round home-and-away season had finished, the 1965 VFL Premiers were determined by the specific format and conventions of the Page–McIntyre system.

North Melbourne Football Club moved its playing and training base from the Arden Street Oval to Coburg City Oval. The move was intended to be permanent, with some initial negotiations seeking long-term leases for up to 40 years, but it was ultimately cancelled after only eight months, and North Melbourne returned to the Arden Street Oval in 1966.

Round 1

|- bgcolor="#CCCCFF"
| Home team
| Home team score
| Away team
| Away team score
| Venue
| Crowd
| Date
|- bgcolor="#FFFFFF"
| 
| 8.16 (64)
| 
| 11.18 (84)
| Brunswick Street Oval
| 17,500
| 17 April 1965
|- bgcolor="#FFFFFF"
| 
| 8.12 (60)
| 
| 8.6 (54)
| Moorabbin Oval
| 51,370
| 17 April 1965
|- bgcolor="#FFFFFF"
| 
| 8.6 (54)
| 
| 12.19 (91)
| Glenferrie Oval
| 36,000
| 17 April 1965
|- bgcolor="#FFFFFF"
| 
| 4.12 (36)
| 
| 6.10 (46)
| City of Coburg Oval
| 13,774
| 19 April 1965
|- bgcolor="#FFFFFF"
| 
| 6.5 (41)
| 
| 7.5 (47)
| MCG
| 36,283
| 19 April 1965
|- bgcolor="#FFFFFF"
| 
| 5.5 (35)
| 
| 5.3 (33)
| Kardinia Park
| 23,233
| 19 April 1965

Round 2

|- bgcolor="#CCCCFF"
| Home team
| Home team score
| Away team
| Away team score
| Venue
| Crowd
| Date
|- bgcolor="#FFFFFF"
| 
| 11.14 (80)
| 
| 10.12 (72)
| MCG
| 21,744
| 24 April 1965
|- bgcolor="#FFFFFF"
| 
| 20.18 (138)
| 
| 6.8 (44)
| Windy Hill
| 20,500
| 24 April 1965
|- bgcolor="#FFFFFF"
| 
| 11.13 (79)
| 
| 9.10 (64)
| Victoria Park
| 31,370
| 24 April 1965
|- bgcolor="#FFFFFF"
| 
| 8.11 (59)
| 
| 9.11 (65)
| Princes Park
| 34,945
| 24 April 1965
|- bgcolor="#FFFFFF"
| 
| 7.9 (51)
| 
| 12.12 (84)
| Lake Oval
| 23,979
| 24 April 1965
|- bgcolor="#FFFFFF"
| 
| 8.6 (54)
| 
| 9.4 (58)
| Western Oval
| 16,998
| 24 April 1965

Round 3

|- bgcolor="#CCCCFF"
| Home team
| Home team score
| Away team
| Away team score
| Venue
| Crowd
| Date
|- bgcolor="#FFFFFF"
| 
| 12.13 (85)
| 
| 14.12 (96)
| MCG
| 43,412
| 1 May 1965
|- bgcolor="#FFFFFF"
| 
| 9.4 (58)
| 
| 14.25 (109)
| Brunswick Street Oval
| 15,890
| 1 May 1965
|- bgcolor="#FFFFFF"
| 
| 19.16 (130)
| 
| 10.9 (69)
| Victoria Park
| 25,733
| 1 May 1965
|- bgcolor="#FFFFFF"
| 
| 7.13 (55)
| 
| 14.14 (98)
| City of Coburg Oval
| 17,408
| 1 May 1965
|- bgcolor="#FFFFFF"
| 
| 6.12 (48)
| 
| 18.18 (126)
| Western Oval
| 24,365
| 1 May 1965
|- bgcolor="#FFFFFF"
| 
| 12.14 (86)
| 
| 10.11 (71)
| Lake Oval
| 23,100
| 1 May 1965

Round 4

|- bgcolor="#CCCCFF"
| Home team
| Home team score
| Away team
| Away team score
| Venue
| Crowd
| Date
|- bgcolor="#FFFFFF"
| 
| 12.8 (80)
| 
| 11.11 (77)
| MCG
| 27,404
| 8 May 1965
|- bgcolor="#FFFFFF"
| 
| 10.9 (69)
| 
| 14.9 (93)
| Windy Hill
| 14,500
| 8 May 1965
|- bgcolor="#FFFFFF"
| 
| 16.11 (107)
| 
| 6.8 (44)
| Princes Park
| 12,728
| 8 May 1965
|- bgcolor="#FFFFFF"
| 
| 14.7 (91)
| 
| 7.8 (50)
| Moorabbin Oval
| 14,454
| 8 May 1965
|- bgcolor="#FFFFFF"
| 
| 14.14 (98)
| 
| 9.7 (61)
| Glenferrie Oval
| 9,000
| 8 May 1965
|- bgcolor="#FFFFFF"
| 
| 7.8 (50)
| 
| 6.9 (45)
| Kardinia Park
| 21,525
| 8 May 1965

Round 5

|- bgcolor="#CCCCFF"
| Home team
| Home team score
| Away team
| Away team score
| Venue
| Crowd
| Date
|- bgcolor="#FFFFFF"
| 
| 8.7 (55)
| 
| 10.9 (69)
| Kardinia Park
| 37,774
| 15 May 1965
|- bgcolor="#FFFFFF"
| 
| 11.11 (77)
| 
| 11.10 (76)
| Western Oval
| 11,253
| 15 May 1965
|- bgcolor="#FFFFFF"
| 
| 12.9 (81)
| 
| 16.13 (109)
| Brunswick Street Oval
| 10,561
| 15 May 1965
|- bgcolor="#FFFFFF"
| 
| 14.21 (105)
| 
| 8.12 (60)
| MCG
| 32,104
| 15 May 1965
|- bgcolor="#FFFFFF"
| 
| 7.14 (56)
| 
| 14.9 (93)
| Moorabbin Oval
| 39,765
| 15 May 1965
|- bgcolor="#FFFFFF"
| 
| 9.11 (65)
| 
| 13.7 (85)
| Victoria Park
| 37,223
| 15 May 1965

Round 6

|- bgcolor="#CCCCFF"
| Home team
| Home team score
| Away team
| Away team score
| Venue
| Crowd
| Date
|- bgcolor="#FFFFFF"
| 
| 8.10 (58)
| 
| 14.12 (96)
| City of Coburg Oval
| 13,291
| 22 May 1965
|- bgcolor="#FFFFFF"
| 
| 8.8 (56)
| 
| 11.21 (87)
| Brunswick Street Oval
| 11,925
| 22 May 1965
|- bgcolor="#FFFFFF"
| 
| 8.13 (61)
| 
| 6.9 (45)
| Princes Park
| 29,949
| 22 May 1965
|- bgcolor="#FFFFFF"
| 
| 12.9 (81)
| 
| 10.14 (74)
| Glenferrie Oval
| 11,800
| 22 May 1965
|- bgcolor="#FFFFFF"
| 
| 14.12 (96)
| 
| 12.16 (88)
| Lake Oval
| 24,200
| 22 May 1965
|- bgcolor="#FFFFFF"
| 
| 6.13 (49)
| 
| 7.5 (47)
| MCG
| 56,808
| 22 May 1965

Round 7

|- bgcolor="#CCCCFF"
| Home team
| Home team score
| Away team
| Away team score
| Venue
| Crowd
| Date
|- bgcolor="#FFFFFF"
| 
| 18.14 (122)
| 
| 6.9 (45)
| Kardinia Park
| 19,004
| 29 May 1965
|- bgcolor="#FFFFFF"
| 
| 9.11 (65)
| 
| 10.9 (69)
| Western Oval
| 18,380
| 29 May 1965
|- bgcolor="#FFFFFF"
| 
| 15.11 (101)
| 
| 10.12 (72)
| Victoria Park
| 33,452
| 29 May 1965
|- bgcolor="#FFFFFF"
| 
| 21.16 (142)
| 
| 6.12 (48)
| MCG
| 24,602
| 29 May 1965
|- bgcolor="#FFFFFF"
| 
| 11.18 (84)
| 
| 5.5 (35)
| Moorabbin Oval
| 18,670
| 29 May 1965
|- bgcolor="#FFFFFF"
| 
| 5.23 (53)
| 
| 10.9 (69)
| Windy Hill
| 35,500
| 29 May 1965

Round 8

|- bgcolor="#CCCCFF"
| Home team
| Home team score
| Away team
| Away team score
| Venue
| Crowd
| Date
|- bgcolor="#FFFFFF"
| 
| 8.14 (62)
| 
| 6.7 (43)
| Kardinia Park
| 27,584
| 5 June 1965
|- bgcolor="#FFFFFF"
| 
| 14.12 (96)
| 
| 11.12 (78)
| Victoria Park
| 25,250
| 5 June 1965
|- bgcolor="#FFFFFF"
| 
| 6.22 (58)
| 
| 13.17 (95)
| Princes Park
| 41,561
| 5 June 1965
|- bgcolor="#FFFFFF"
| 
| 13.24 (102)
| 
| 12.19 (91)
| Lake Oval
| 17,400
| 5 June 1965
|- bgcolor="#FFFFFF"
| 
| 21.17 (143)
| 
| 10.15 (75)
| MCG
| 20,649
| 5 June 1965
|- bgcolor="#FFFFFF"
| 
| 11.15 (81)
| 
| 13.10 (88)
| City of Coburg Oval
| 12,828
| 5 June 1965

Round 9

|- bgcolor="#CCCCFF"
| Home team
| Home team score
| Away team
| Away team score
| Venue
| Crowd
| Date
|- bgcolor="#FFFFFF"
| 
| 14.10 (94)
| 
| 14.13 (97)
| Glenferrie Oval
| 11,000
| 12 June 1965
|- bgcolor="#FFFFFF"
| 
| 20.9 (129)
| 
| 17.13 (115)
| Lake Oval
| 32,260
| 12 June 1965
|- bgcolor="#FFFFFF"
| 
| 7.12 (54)
| 
| 12.14 (86)
| Windy Hill
| 34,900
| 12 June 1965
|- bgcolor="#FFFFFF"
| 
| 9.7 (61)
| 
| 18.14 (122)
| MCG
| 72,114
| 14 June 1965
|- bgcolor="#FFFFFF"
| 
| 9.11 (65)
| 
| 9.17 (71)
| Western Oval
| 25,345
| 14 June 1965
|- bgcolor="#FFFFFF"
| 
| 9.7 (61)
| 
| 14.18 (102)
| Brunswick Street Oval
| 20,140
| 14 June 1965

Round 10

|- bgcolor="#CCCCFF"
| Home team
| Home team score
| Away team
| Away team score
| Venue
| Crowd
| Date
|- bgcolor="#FFFFFF"
| 
| 12.9 (81)
| 
| 9.11 (65)
| Kardinia Park
| 25,350
| 26 June 1965
|- bgcolor="#FFFFFF"
| 
| 14.16 (100)
| 
| 14.10 (94)
| Brunswick Street Oval
| 12,626
| 26 June 1965
|- bgcolor="#FFFFFF"
| 
| 12.10 (82)
| 
| 8.10 (58)
| Princes Park
| 19,680
| 26 June 1965
|- bgcolor="#FFFFFF"
| 
| 24.12 (156)
| 
| 11.9 (75)
| Moorabbin Oval
| 20,010
| 26 June 1965
|- bgcolor="#FFFFFF"
| 
| 6.6 (42)
| 
| 10.11 (71)
| MCG
| 51,420
| 26 June 1965
|- bgcolor="#FFFFFF"
| 
| 12.11 (83)
| 
| 13.12 (90)
| City of Coburg Oval
| 21,626
| 26 June 1965

Round 11

|- bgcolor="#CCCCFF"
| Home team
| Home team score
| Away team
| Away team score
| Venue
| Crowd
| Date
|- bgcolor="#FFFFFF"
| 
| 9.13 (67)
| 
| 19.11 (125)
| Glenferrie Oval
| 14,900
| 3 July 1965
|- bgcolor="#FFFFFF"
| 
| 7.10 (52)
| 
| 5.10 (40)
| Western Oval
| 14,150
| 3 July 1965
|- bgcolor="#FFFFFF"
| 
| 12.8 (80)
| 
| 10.14 (74)
| Moorabbin Oval
| 35,794
| 3 July 1965
|- bgcolor="#FFFFFF"
| 
| 23.20 (158)
| 
| 12.10 (82)
| MCG
| 35,200
| 10 July 1965
|- bgcolor="#FFFFFF"
| 
| 12.16 (88)
| 
| 6.9 (45)
| Windy Hill
| 27,000
| 10 July 1965
|- bgcolor="#FFFFFF"
| 
| 10.14 (74)
| 
| 4.6 (30)
| Victoria Park
| 20,657
| 10 July 1965

Round 12

|- bgcolor="#CCCCFF"
| Home team
| Home team score
| Away team
| Away team score
| Venue
| Crowd
| Date
|- bgcolor="#FFFFFF"
| 
| 9.6 (60)
| 
| 9.12 (66)
| MCG
| 36,830
| 17 July 1965
|- bgcolor="#FFFFFF"
| 
| 1.8 (14)
| 
| 5.13 (43)
| Western Oval
| 13,395
| 17 July 1965
|- bgcolor="#FFFFFF"
| 
| 12.12 (84)
| 
| 3.8 (26)
| Windy Hill
| 10,650
| 17 July 1965
|- bgcolor="#FFFFFF"
| 
| 8.13 (61)
| 
| 7.5 (47)
| Victoria Park
| 29,357
| 17 July 1965
|- bgcolor="#FFFFFF"
| 
| 8.19 (67)
| 
| 8.4 (52)
| Princes Park
| 12,791
| 17 July 1965
|- bgcolor="#FFFFFF"
| 
| 8.8 (56)
| 
| 6.17 (53)
| Lake Oval
| 9,520
| 17 July 1965

Round 13

|- bgcolor="#CCCCFF"
| Home team
| Home team score
| Away team
| Away team score
| Venue
| Crowd
| Date
|- bgcolor="#FFFFFF"
| 
| 18.9 (117)
| 
| 6.12 (48)
| Moorabbin Oval
| 18,709
| 24 July 1965
|- bgcolor="#FFFFFF"
| 
| 7.13 (55)
| 
| 6.6 (42)
| Brunswick Street Oval
| 7,456
| 24 July 1965
|- bgcolor="#FFFFFF"
| 
| 11.15 (81)
| 
| 9.6 (60)
| City of Coburg Oval
| 8,312
| 24 July 1965
|- bgcolor="#FFFFFF"
| 
| 7.5 (47)
| 
| 10.11 (71)
| Glenferrie Oval
| 11,400
| 24 July 1965
|- bgcolor="#FFFFFF"
| 
| 8.8 (56)
| 
| 12.7 (79)
| MCG
| 56,360
| 24 July 1965
|- bgcolor="#FFFFFF"
| 
| 5.9 (39)
| 
| 9.12 (66)
| Kardinia Park
| 19,568
| 24 July 1965

Round 14

|- bgcolor="#CCCCFF"
| Home team
| Home team score
| Away team
| Away team score
| Venue
| Crowd
| Date
|- bgcolor="#FFFFFF"
| 
| 10.17 (77)
| 
| 5.4 (34)
| Kardinia Park
| 19,658
| 31 July 1965
|- bgcolor="#FFFFFF"
| 
| 13.18 (96)
| 
| 6.11 (47)
| Windy Hill
| 16,800
| 31 July 1965
|- bgcolor="#FFFFFF"
| 
| 9.19 (73)
| 
| 13.12 (90)
| Princes Park
| 20,744
| 31 July 1965
|- bgcolor="#FFFFFF"
| 
| 14.12 (96)
| 
| 11.17 (83)
| Moorabbin Oval
| 34,076
| 31 July 1965
|- bgcolor="#FFFFFF"
| 
| 12.11 (83)
| 
| 11.15 (81)
| MCG
| 30,381
| 31 July 1965
|- bgcolor="#FFFFFF"
| 
| 8.12 (60)
| 
| 12.22 (94)
| Glenferrie Oval
| 18,500
| 31 July 1965

Round 15

|- bgcolor="#CCCCFF"
| Home team
| Home team score
| Away team
| Away team score
| Venue
| Crowd
| Date
|- bgcolor="#FFFFFF"
| 
| 6.9 (45)
| 
| 9.15 (69)
| Western Oval
| 11,313
| 7 August 1965
|- bgcolor="#FFFFFF"
| 
| 4.12 (36)
| 
| 8.6 (54)
| Brunswick Street Oval
| 7,463
| 7 August 1965
|- bgcolor="#FFFFFF"
| 
| 14.9 (93)
| 
| 7.4 (46)
| Victoria Park
| 26,915
| 7 August 1965
|- bgcolor="#FFFFFF"
| 
| 11.12 (78)
| 
| 5.9 (39)
| Lake Oval
| 15,130
| 7 August 1965
|- bgcolor="#FFFFFF"
| 
| 14.10 (94)
| 
| 5.6 (36)
| MCG
| 32,031
| 7 August 1965
|- bgcolor="#FFFFFF"
| 
| 6.8 (44)
| 
| 5.2 (32)
| City of Coburg Oval
| 11,474
| 7 August 1965

Round 16

|- bgcolor="#CCCCFF"
| Home team
| Home team score
| Away team
| Away team score
| Venue
| Crowd
| Date
|- bgcolor="#FFFFFF"
| 
| 9.14 (68)
| 
| 16.14 (110)
| Glenferrie Oval
| 15,000
| 14 August 1965
|- bgcolor="#FFFFFF"
| 
| 9.15 (69)
| 
| 9.10 (64)
| Windy Hill
| 28,700
| 14 August 1965
|- bgcolor="#FFFFFF"
| 
| 11.16 (82)
| 
| 16.11 (107)
| Princes Park
| 36,730
| 14 August 1965
|- bgcolor="#FFFFFF"
| 
| 11.7 (73)
| 
| 16.11 (107)
| MCG
| 44,753
| 14 August 1965
|- bgcolor="#FFFFFF"
| 
| 10.18 (78)
| 
| 13.14 (92)
| Lake Oval
| 13,600
| 14 August 1965
|- bgcolor="#FFFFFF"
| 
| 12.10 (82)
| 
| 12.11 (83)
| City of Coburg Oval
| 7,788
| 14 August 1965

Round 17

|- bgcolor="#CCCCFF"
| Home team
| Home team score
| Away team
| Away team score
| Venue
| Crowd
| Date
|- bgcolor="#FFFFFF"
| 
| 4.17 (41)
| 
| 11.6 (72)
| Western Oval
| 10,496
| 21 August 1965
|- bgcolor="#FFFFFF"
| 
| 14.13 (97)
| 
| 4.7 (31)
| Windy Hill
| 18,950
| 21 August 1965
|- bgcolor="#FFFFFF"
| 
| 14.10 (94)
| 
| 7.10 (52)
| Victoria Park
| 33,318
| 21 August 1965
|- bgcolor="#FFFFFF"
| 
| 12.13 (85)
| 
| 6.12 (48)
| Moorabbin Oval
| 18,704
| 21 August 1965
|- bgcolor="#FFFFFF"
| 
| 9.16 (70)
| 
| 8.4 (52)
| Kardinia Park
| 15,651
| 21 August 1965
|- bgcolor="#FFFFFF"
| 
| 14.8 (92)
| 
| 10.9 (69)
| MCG
| 40,576
| 21 August 1965

Round 18

|- bgcolor="#CCCCFF"
| Home team
| Home team score
| Away team
| Away team score
| Venue
| Crowd
| Date
|- bgcolor="#FFFFFF"
| 
| 11.12 (78)
| 
| 6.12 (48)
| City of Coburg Oval
| 11,867
| 28 August 1965
|- bgcolor="#FFFFFF"
| 
| 16.6 (102)
| 
| 19.13 (127)
| Brunswick Street Oval
| 15,782
| 28 August 1965
|- bgcolor="#FFFFFF"
| 
| 10.9 (69)
| 
| 9.6 (60)
| Princes Park
| 26,267
| 28 August 1965
|- bgcolor="#FFFFFF"
| 
| 10.9 (69)
| 
| 17.20 (122)
| Glenferrie Oval
| 15,106
| 28 August 1965
|- bgcolor="#FFFFFF"
| 
| 10.12 (72)
| 
| 10.15 (75)
| MCG
| 19,532
| 28 August 1965
|- bgcolor="#FFFFFF"
| 
| 13.16 (94)
| 
| 12.6 (78)
| Lake Oval
| 28,860
| 28 August 1965

Ladder

Night Series Competition
The night series were held under the floodlights at Lake Oval, South Melbourne, for the teams (5th to 12th on ladder) out of the finals at the end of the season.

Final: North Melbourne 14.13 (97) defeated Carlton 9.3 (57).

Premiership Finals

First Semi-Final

Second Semi-Final

Preliminary Final

Grand final

Awards
 The 1965 VFL Premiership team was Essendon.
 Hawthorn won the "wooden spoon" for 1965. As of 2021, this remains the club's latest wooden spoon.
 The VFL's leading goalkicker was John Peck of Hawthorn who kicked 56 goals; he was the third player to win the goalkicking when his team won the "wooden spoon", and the first since Roy Park of University in 1913.
 The winner of the 1965 Brownlow Medal was Ian Stewart of St Kilda with 20 votes; he won on a count-back from Noel Teasdale of North Melbourne.
As a consequence of its 1981 decision to change its rules relating to tied Brownlow Medal contests, the AFL awarded a retrospective medal to Teasdale in 1989.
Collingwood 16.9 (105) defeated  10.20 (80) in the Grand Final, held as a curtain-raiser to the seniors Grand Final at the Melbourne Cricket Ground on 25 September.

Notable events
 Melbourne's 1964 premiership captain Ron Barassi was cleared to Carlton as captain/coach, one of the most significant player transfers in the Coulter Law era.
 Three teams moved their home grounds in 1965. This would begin a suburban ground rationalization process which eventually ended forty years later in 2005, which saw all Melbourne based teams eventually play their home games at the Melbourne Cricket Ground and Docklands Stadium.
 moved its training and playing base from Junction Oval to Moorabbin Oval, after signing a 75-year lease with the Moorabbin Council in June 1964.
Richmond moved its home ground for matches to the Melbourne Cricket Ground, sharing it with Melbourne, while continuing to train at the Punt Road Oval, because roadwork to widen Punt Road was going to significantly reduce Punt Road Oval's capacity.
 moved its training and playing base from Arden Street Oval to Coburg City Oval, after signing a seven-year lease with the Coburg Council in April 1965. The move was not successful for either party, and the club returned to Arden Street Oval in 1966.
 In the Round 2 match against Essendon, Hawthorn forward Garry Young sustained a painful injury from a hard knock. Hawthorn captain Graham Arthur stood over him and said "Get up you weak bastard", and Young returned to the play and did his best to continue. Eventually he left the ground and went to hospital where it was discovered that he had a perforated bowel and peritonitis, both of which are life-threatening conditions. He never played again.
 In Round 6, Essendon forward Geoff Gosper was the first VFL player to play with a mouthguard.
 Victoria played two interstate matches against South Australia during the season. On Saturday 19 June, at the Melbourne Cricket Ground, Victoria won 19.17 (131) to 9.18 (72); on 10 July, in Adelaide, South Australia won 12.11 (83) to 3.1 (19). 	
 After opening the season with eight consecutive wins, Melbourne fell to 9-3 after Round 12, then sacked coach Norm Smith. He was reinstated before Round 14, but Smith had also been unhappy about his lack of support from the Melbourne Football Club in the libel case that had been brought against him by VFL umpire Don Blew in the late 1964. The sacking is said to have given rise to a sports curse, which saw Melbourne miss the finals for the first time since 1953 (after a twelve-year period under Smith which had netted six premierships), fail to reach another finals series until 1987, and fail to win another premiership until 2021.
 St Kilda played in a Grand Final for the first time since 1913.
 Essendon's half-forward flanker John Somerville was felled behind play in first 10 minutes of the 1965 Preliminary Final. His opponent for the day, Collingwood's Duncan Wright, was never selected to play for Collingwood again. The field umpire, Ron Brophy, was never selected to umpire a VFL match again. (See Duncan Wright and John Somerville.)

References

 Maplestone, M., Flying Higher: History of the Essendon Football Club 1872–1996, Essendon Football Club, (Melbourne), 1996. 
 Rogers, S. & Brown, A., Every Game Ever Played: VFL/AFL Results 1897–1997 (Sixth Edition), Viking Books, (Ringwood), 1998. 
 Ross, J. (ed), 100 Years of Australian Football 1897–1996: The Complete Story of the AFL, All the Big Stories, All the Great Pictures, All the Champions, Every AFL Season Reported, Viking, (Ringwood), 1996.

External links
 1965 Season – AFL Tables
 Richard Allsop, "Round 15 Footy Flashbacks: Player of the week – Garry Young", (Official Website of the Hawthorn Football Club, 11 July 2007)

Australian Football League seasons
VFL season